Wainfleet railway station serves the town of Wainfleet All Saints in Lincolnshire, England. The station has its own signal box at the east end of the platforms, which is next to the level crossing.

The station is now owned by Network Rail and managed by East Midlands Railway who provide all rail services.

The station is unstaffed and offers limited facilities other than two shelters, bicycle storage, timetables and modern 'Help Points'. The full range of tickets for travel are purchased from the guard on the train at no extra cost, there are no retail facilities at this station.

History
The station was opened by the Wainfleet and Firsby Railway for passenger traffic on 24 October 1871. The passenger service was extended from Wainfleet to Skegness on 28 July 1873. 

On 23 June 1881 there was an accident on a service from Skegness to Nottingham. A carriage left the rails at Wainfleet which derailed the carriages behind it which resulted in injuries to several passengers including one with a broken leg.

From 1896 the Wainfleet and Firsby Railway was taken over by the Great Northern Railway.

Stationmasters

Thomas Poole ca .1872
Thomas Ramsden Wharam ca. 1876
Robert John Lewin 1882  - ca. 1894 (formerly station master at Ancaster)
Herbert Brader 1896  (afterwards station master at Bourne)
George Guy before 1900
Charles E. Riddout ca. 1900 ca. 1904
Frank L. Curtis ca. 1913
Robert Bruntlett ca. 1919
Frank Pickworth ca. 1926
Arthur White 1930 - 1947 
William George Lusher ca. 1950 ca. 1961

Services
All services at Wainfleet are operated by East Midlands Railway.

On Sundays, the service is served by a limited service in each direction, with additional services during the summer months. Enhancements to the Sunday service are due to be made during the life of the East Midlands franchise.

See also
Firsby to Skegness railway branch line

References

External links

Railway stations in Lincolnshire
DfT Category F1 stations
Former Great Northern Railway stations
Railway stations in Great Britain opened in 1871
Railway stations served by East Midlands Railway
Wainfleet All Saints